Franck Olivier Ongfiang (born 6 April 1985) is a Cameroonian former professional footballer who played as a midfielder.

Club career

Early career and Italy
Born in Yaoundé, Ongfiang started his European career at France for Bordeaux. In the 2001–02 season, he was signed by Venezia and made his Serie A debut on 17 March 2002 against Chievo, substituted Arturo Di Napoli in the last minutes. The match ended in 1–1 draw. At that time he was the 4th all-time youngest Serie A foreign player, after Valeri Bojinov, Lampros Choutos and Claiton.

In August 2002, after Venezia's owner Maurizio Zamparini purchased Palermo, he followed his team-mates likes Di Napoli, Kewullay Conteh, Mario Santana, Igor Budan, Stefano Morrone and Daniel Andersson, etc. transferred to the Sicily side.

In 2003–04 season, he left for Cesena of Serie C1 on loan. In the next season, played for Martina.

Africa & Middle East
On 1 July 2005, he left for Espérance de Tunis and played at 2005 CAF Champions League.

In 2007, he left for Al Ain and played at 2007 AFC Champions League. In mid-2008, he left for Al Ahly Tripoli.

Ukraine
In March 2011 he sign for the Ukrainian side Zirka Kirovohrad.

International career
Ongfiang was the captain of Cameroon U20 team at 2005 African Youth Championship qualification.

Ongfiang was a member of Cameroon U23 team. He was called up to a 42-men preliminary squad for 2004 CAF Men's Pre-Olympic Tournament against Ivory Coast U23 team in February 2004.

In November 2004, he was called up to the senior national team against Germany as reserve player. He also capped for Cameroon Youth team at 2007 All-Africa Games.

References

External links
  Profile at ilpalermocalcio.it – The Official Site of Palermo
 

Living people
1985 births
Footballers from Yaoundé
Association football midfielders
Cameroonian footballers
Cameroon under-20 international footballers
Serie A players
Serie B players
FC Girondins de Bordeaux players
Venezia F.C. players
Palermo F.C. players
A.C. Cesena players
A.S.D. Martina Calcio 1947 players
Espérance Sportive de Tunis players
Al Ain FC players
Sharjah FC players
FC Zirka Kropyvnytskyi players
Cameroonian expatriate footballers
Expatriate footballers in France
Expatriate footballers in Italy
Expatriate footballers in Tunisia
Expatriate footballers in the United Arab Emirates
Expatriate footballers in Libya
Expatriate footballers in Ukraine
Cameroonian expatriate sportspeople in France
Cameroonian expatriate sportspeople in the United Arab Emirates
Cameroonian expatriate sportspeople in Italy
Cameroonian expatriate sportspeople in Tunisia
Cameroonian expatriate sportspeople in Libya
UAE Pro League players